The Order of Roraima of Guyana is the second highest National Award of Guyana, and is limited to only thirty five living Guyanese recipients.  Established in 1976, it is awarded to any citizen of Guyana who has given outstanding service to the nation.  Citizens of foreign nations who are deemed eligible may be appointed as honorary members of the order.

Recipients 

 Désirée Bernard
 Harold Bollers
 Viola Burnham
 Martin Carter
 Kim Jong-il
 Edward Luckhoo
 Mary Noel Menezes
 Mia Mottley
 Sase Narain
 Jane Phillips-Gay
 Freundel Stuart

References

See also 
 Orders, decorations, and medals of Guyana

Orders, decorations, and medals of Guyana
Awards established in 1976
1976 establishments in Guyana